Joseph C. Wolff (January 19, 1849 Besançon, France  – November 26, 1896 New York City) was an American lawyer and  politician from New York.

Life
The family emigrated to the United States in 1855, and settled in New York City. He attended the grammar schools. In 1864, he enlisted in the 2nd New York Light Cavalry Regiment as a bugler, and took part in the battles of Opequon, Cedar Creek and Five Forks.

He graduated from Columbia Law School in 1874, was admitted to the bar, and practiced law in New York City.

Wolff was a member of the New York State Assembly (New York Co., 16th D.) in 1893; and of the New York State Senate (11th D.) in 1894 and 1895. In 1896, he was appointed as Clerk of the Seventh District Court.

He died on November 26, 1896, at his home, at 168 East 61st Street in New York City, "after a lingering illness".

Sources
 The New York Red Book compiled by Edgar L. Murlin (published by James B. Lyon, Albany NY, 1897; pg. 404 and 510)
 Sketches of the members of the Legislature in The Evening Journal Almanac (1895; pg. 49)
 DEATH LIST OF A DAY; Joseph C. Wolff in NYT on November 29, 1896

1849 births
1896 deaths
Democratic Party New York (state) state senators
Lawyers from New York City
Democratic Party members of the New York State Assembly
French emigrants to the United States
Columbia Law School alumni
19th-century American politicians
Politicians from New York City
19th-century American lawyers